Archie L. Edwards (September 4, 1918 – June 18, 1998) was an American Piedmont blues guitarist, who in a sporadic career spanning several decades worked with Mississippi John Hurt, Skip James, and John Jackson. His best-known recordings are "Saturday Night Hop", "The Road Is Rough and Rocky", and "I Called My Baby Long Distance". In the late 1950s he owned a barbershop that attracted blues musicians who helped to start his musical career.

Describing his musical style, Edwards said, "I play what they call the old Piedmont style, but I call it East Virginia blues 'cause that's where I learned it".

Biography
Edwards was born on a farm near Union Hall, Virginia. His early work left some time to engage with local musicians, but he had to share his first guitar with his two brothers. Inspired by recordings of Blind Boy Fuller and Blind Lemon Jefferson, he played locally and found employment in a sawmill. In 1937, he relocated to New Jersey, where he worked as a chauffeur, He later worked in a hotel in Columbus, Ohio. Edwards served in the military police during World War II. He struggled to settle in the postwar years and eventually found work as a barber. He opened his own barbershop in Washington, D.C., in 1959. It was frequented by Mississippi John Hurt, and the duo formed a loose working relationship with Skip James, which endured for several years before Hurt's death in 1966. After mourning his friend, Edwards wrote the song "The Road Is Rough and Rocky".

Edwards found more regular work at music festivals and in local clubs. He also joined John Jackson, John Cephas and Phil Wiggins, Flora Molton and Mother Scott, who performed around Washington billed as the Travelling Blues Workshop.

In 1982, Edwards joined the American Folk Blues Festival in a tour of Europe. L & R Records subsequently released Living Country Blues USA, Vol. 6: The Road Is Rough (1982). After returning from touring continental Europe, Edwards teamed up with Eleanor Ellis and Flora Molton. The threesome toured across the United States, Canada and Europe, including Charlie Musselwhite in the entourage in 1987.

Edwards then recorded for Mapleshade Records, releasing Blues 'n Bones in 1989.

Edwards died in Seat Pleasant, Maryland, in June 1998, at the age of 79. The posthumous album The Toronto Sessions is based on work he recorded in Canada in 1986.

Discography

See also
List of Piedmont blues musicians

References

External links
Illustrated discography at Wirz.de

1918 births
1998 deaths
American blues guitarists
American male guitarists
American blues singers
Piedmont blues musicians
Singers from Virginia
Songwriters from Virginia
People from Franklin County, Virginia
20th-century American singers
20th-century American guitarists
Guitarists from Virginia
20th-century American male singers
Northern Blues Music artists
Mapleshade Records artists
American military personnel of World War II
American military police officers
American male songwriters